Jbel Outgui is an extinct shield volcano located 15 km southeast of the city of El Hajeb in the Middle Atlas of Morocco. The mountain is one of the three main volcanic structures of the Azrou region with Jbel El Koudiate and Jbel Tamarrakoit.

See also 

 Azrou volcanic field

References 

Atlas Mountains
Geography of Fès-Meknès
Pleistocene shield volcanoes
Volcanoes of Morocco
Mountains of Morocco